Santiago Omar Riveros (born 4 August 1923) is an Argentinian general, who occupied various charges during the dictatorship known as National Reorganization Process, such as Commander of Military Institutions, chief of Campo de Mayo base and ambassador of Argentina in Uruguay.

During the dictatorship he was in charge of the coordination of the Operation Condor with anothers dictatorships in the Americas. After the recuperation of the democracy in Argentina, he received a pardon of President Carlos Menem for his actions during that period. Nevertheless, that pardon was annulled and he was convicted of crimes against humanity to life in a civilian prison in 2006.

References 

1923 births

Living people